Jeremiah Joseph Hennessy (February 22, 1926 – November 3, 2000) was an American football end in the National Football League for the Chicago Cardinals and the Washington Redskins.  He played college football at Santa Clara University and was drafted in the thirteenth round of the 1950 NFL Draft.

1926 births
2000 deaths
Players of American football from Los Angeles
American football wide receivers
Santa Clara Broncos football players
Chicago Cardinals players
Washington Redskins players